Anna Lührmann (born 14 June 1983 in Lich, Hesse) is a German political science professor and politician of Alliance 90/The Greens who has been serving as a member of the German Bundestag since the 2021 elections. In addition to her work in parliament, she has been Minister of State at the Federal Foreign Office in the government of Chancellor Olaf Scholz since December 8, 2021. 

Lührmann became the youngest-ever member of the German Parliament in 2002, as well as the youngest member of parliament in the world. As an academic, she later served as the Deputy Director of the Varieties of Democracy (V-Dem) Institute and Assistant Professor at the University of Gothenburg, and returned to politics in 2021, currently representing the Rheingau-Taunus-Limburg constituency in the German Bundestag.

Political career
Lührmann first became involved in the Green Party at thirteen and her election came after a fast career in the youth organisation Grün-Alternatives Jugendbündnis.

Member of the German Parliament, 2002–2009
In parliament, Lührmann served on the Budget Committee from 2004 until 2009. In this capacity, she was her parliamentary group’s rapporteur on the annual budgets of the Federal Ministry of Transport, Building and Urban Affairs, the Federal Ministry of Family Affairs, Senior Citizens, Women and Youth and the Federal Ministry for Economic Affairs and Technology.

Academic career
Lührmann began studying political sciences at FernUniversität Hagen, where she obtained her BA, followed by a MSc in Gender and Peace Studies from Ahfad University (Sudan), and a MA in Research Training in Social Sciences from Humboldt University of Berlin. In 2015, she received her PhD from Humboldt University. In August 2015, she joined the Varieties of Democracy Institute at the Department of Political Science, University of Gothenburg, Sweden, as Postdoctoral Research Fellow. Lührmann's research interests include democratic resilience, autocracy, elections, regime legitimacy, and democracy aid and the United Nations.

From 2009 until 2011 Lührmann advised the UNDP in Sudan on electoral and parliamentary issues. She is lead author of UNDP's handbook "Enhancing Youth Political Participation Throughout the Electoral Cycle A Good Practice Guide", published in 2013.

Return to politics
Lührmann has been a member of the German Bundestag again since the 2021 elections. Following the formation of the government of Chancellor Olaf Scholz, Minister for Foreign Affairs Annalena Baerbock appointed her Minister of State at the Federal Foreign Office. In this capacity, she represents the German government in the General Affairs Council and the Committee of Ministers of the Council of Europe.

Other activities
 Jacques Delors Centre at Hertie School, Member of the Advisory Board (since 2022)
 Tarabya Cultural Academy, Ex-Officio Chair of the Advisory Board (since 2022)
 Franco-German Institute Ludwigsburg (dfi), Ex-Officio Member of the Executive Committee (since 2021)
 Center for International Peace Operations (ZIF), Ex-Officio Chair of the International Advisory Board (since 2021)
 Project Adjust, University of Kiel, Member of the Advisory Board 
 German Federation for the Environment and Nature Conservation (BUND), Member
 European Partnership for Democracy (EPD), Member of the Advisory Board
 German Federal Environmental Foundation (DBU), Member of the Board of Trustees (2007–2008)
 German Foundation for World Population (DSW), Member of the Board of Trustees (2002–2005)

Political positions
Lührmann belongs to the moderate wing of the Green Party.

References

External links

 Germany's youngest MP to take seat for Greens at 19
 Enhancing Youth Political Participation Throughout the Electoral Cycle – A Good Practice Guide | Library | Youthpolicy.org
 Researchers | V-Dem
 

1983 births
Living people
People from Lich, Germany
Members of the Bundestag for Hesse
Female members of the Bundestag
21st-century German women politicians
Members of the Bundestag 2021–2025
Members of the Bundestag 2005–2009
Members of the Bundestag 2002–2005
Members of the Bundestag for Alliance 90/The Greens
Ahfad University for Women alumni